Mogos Tuemay Abraha (born 24 May 1997) is an Ethiopian long-distance runner. He competed in the senior men's race at the 2019 IAAF World Cross Country Championships held in Aarhus, Denmark. He finished in 18th place. In the same year, he also competed in the men's 5000 metres event at the 2019 Diamond League Shanghai where he finished in 13th place with a new personal best of 13:15.04.

He competed at the African Cross Country Championships in 2016 and in 2018.

In 2020, he won the 63rd edition of the Campaccio held in San Giorgio su Legnano, Italy.

References

External links 
 

Living people
1997 births
Place of birth missing (living people)
Ethiopian male long-distance runners
Ethiopian male cross country runners
African Championships in Athletics winners
21st-century Ethiopian people